Raphael Montes de Carvalho (born September 22, 1990) is a Brazilian crime novelist and lawyer. His best-known work is the 2014 novel Perfect Days.

Montes was born in Rio de Janeiro on 22 September 1990. He studied at Colégio de São Bento, where he attended middle-school and high-school. He then studied law at the Universidade do Estado do Rio de Janeiro, graduating in 2012.

He debuted in literature in 2009, publishing in the police anthology Assassinos S / A: Brazilian police tales (Editora Multifoco), by the editor Frodo Oliveira and organizer Jana Lauxen. His first tale to win the pages of a book was "The Teacher" in volume 1 of the anthology. He also published in the anthology Beco do Crime (Frodo Oliveira and André Esteves) also in 2009, by the same Editora Multifoco.

In 2010, Montes participated in a contest from Brazilian publishing house Benvirá/Saraiva, in which his novel Suicidas was awarded second place. Saraiva published the novel under their label Benvirá in 2012. The gruesome themes present in the story and Montes’ young age earned him widespread notoriety in Brazil.

In 2014, Montes published his second novel, Dias Perfeitos (Perfect Days), and as of February 2016, the novel has been released in 14 countries. Both, first and second books, had the rights sold to film adaptations.

The Village, his third book, is a fix-up horror novel throughout comics draws short stories of macabre characters are told.

The author's fourth book, Jantar Secreto (Secret Dinner), has divided opinions in 2016 when it was discovered that cannibalism was the main theme but both sides confirmed that it was the best book written by Montes.

Bibliography

References

External links

Living people
Brazilian male novelists
Writers from Rio de Janeiro (city)
1990 births
21st-century Brazilian novelists
21st-century Brazilian male writers